Catechin 5-O-glucoside is a flavanol glucoside. It can be found in rhubarb and in the bark of Rhaphiolepis umbellata. It can also be formed from (+)-catechin by plant-cultured cells of Eucalyptus perriniana.

References 

Flavanols
Flavonoid glucosides